Glendenning is a suburb of Sydney, in the state of New South Wales, Australia. Glendenning is located 44 kilometres west of the Sydney central business district, in the local government area of the City of Blacktown and is part of the Greater Western Sydney region.

History 
Glendenning was officially declared a suburb in 1987. It is named after William Glendenning, a Plumpton butcher who, in the early 1900s, had a slaughteryard in Lamb Street in what is now Glendenning.

William Scott Glendinning was the son of James Glendinning and Agnes Scott. He was born in Glasgow Scotland on 17 December 1864. His surname on his birth registration is Glendinning.

Landmarks 
The Free Wesleyan Church of Tonga on the corner of Glendenning Road and Lamb Street was officially opened in October 2008 by George Tupou V, the King of Tonga. Bus operator Busways has a depot at 150 Glendenning Road.

People 
Glendenning had 5,131 residents in the 2016 census. The area could be characterised as classic mortgage belt with 59.7% of homes being purchased, almost double the national average. The median housing loan repayment of $2,000 per month was higher than average but so too was the median household income of $1,906 per week. The number of couples with children (64.2%) was well above average and the median age of residents (31) was well below the national median. Aboriginal and Torres Strait Islander people made up 2.0% of the population.  52.8% of people were born in Australia. The next most common countries of birth were Philippines 12.7%, India 11.4%, Fiji 2.9% and New Zealand 2.0%. 48.6% of people spoke only English at home. Other languages spoken at home included Punjabi 9.4%, Tagalog 8.6%, Hindi 5.3%, Filipino 3.4% and Arabic 2.3%. The most common responses for religion were Catholic 34.0%, No Religion 11.3%, Hinduism 9.6%, Sikhism 8.7% and Anglican 8.6%.

Notable residents 
Marlisa Punzalan, winner of the sixth season of The X Factor Australia
 Ariaduta Suryapranata, Silver medallist for Bandung Textile Taekwondo Open 2016 (Flyweight Class), National Champion & People’s Athlete for Indonesian Taekwondo Championship 2016

References

External links 

Suburbs of Sydney
City of Blacktown